This is a list of current and former Roman Catholic churches in the Roman Catholic Diocese of Kalamazoo. The diocese is located in the southwestern portion of Michigan's lower peninsula and includes more than 55 churches in the cities of Battle Creek and Kalamazoo and the counties of Allegan, Van Buren, Berrien, Cass, Saint Joseph, Kalamazoo, Branch, Calhoun, and Barry.

The cathedral church of the diocese is the Cathedral of Saint Augustine in Kalamazoo.

Battle Creek

Benton Harbor and St. Joseph

Kalamazoo

Other areas

References

 
Kalamazoo